Krasnoperekopsk Raion is one of the 25 regions of the Autonomous Republic of Crimea, a territory recognized by a majority of countries as part of Ukraine and incorporated by Russia as the Republic of Crimea. It is situated in the northern part of the republic. The administrative center of the raion is the town of Krasnoperekopsk, though it is not a part of the district and is incorporated separately. Population:

References

Raions of Crimea